Microsoft Anti-Virus (MSAV) is an antivirus program introduced by Microsoft for its MS-DOS operating system. The program first appeared in MS-DOS version 6.0 (1993)
and last appeared in MS-DOS 6.22. The first version of the antivirus program was basic, had no inbuilt update facility (updates had to be obtained from a BBS and manually installed by the user) and could scan for 1,234 different viruses. Microsoft Anti-Virus for Windows (MWAV), included as part of the package, was a front end that allowed MSAV to run properly on Windows 3.1x.

In 2009, Microsoft launched an in-house antivirus solution named Microsoft Security Essentials, which later was phased out in favor of Microsoft Defender.

History 
Microsoft Anti-Virus was supplied by Central Point Software Inc. (later acquired by Symantec in 1994 and integrated into Symantec's Norton AntiVirus product) and was a stripped-down version of the Central Point Anti-Virus (CPAV) product which Central Point Software Inc., had licensed from Carmel Software Engineering in Haifa, Israel. Carmel Software sold the product as Turbo Anti-Virus both domestically and abroad.

Microsoft Anti-Virus for Windows was also provided by Central Point Software.

Features 
MSAV featured the "Detect and Clean" strategy and the detection of boot sector and Trojan horse-type viruses (which were typical virus problems at that time).

The program also had an anti-stealth and check sum feature that could be used to detect any changes in normal files. This technology was intended to make up for the unavailability of regular update packages. The final update of MSAV was released in June 1996 by Symantec. The update added the ability to detect polymorphic viruses and the virus definitions were updated to scan for a total of 2,371 viruses.

VSafe TSR 

VSafe is a terminate and stay resident component of MSAV that provided real-time virus protection.

By default, VSafe does the following:
 Checks executable files for viruses (on execution).
 Checks all disks (hard drive and floppy) for boot sector viruses.
 Warns of attempts to write to the boot sector or partition table of the hard disk
 Warns of formatting that could erase the hard disk.
There are more features that can be enabled, VSafe can:
 Warn of attempts of executable files to terminate and stay resident (by normal methods).
 Prevent programs from writing to disk.
 Warn of attempts to write to the boot sector of a floppy disk.
 Warn of attempts to modify executable files.

VSafe had a number of virus definitions embedded within its executable and was capable of loading additional signatures (updates) from an external definition file.

See also

 Internet Security
 Comparison of antivirus software
 Comparison of firewalls

References

Anti-Virus
Antivirus software
1993 software
DOS software

de:Central Point Anti-Virus#Microsoft Anti-Virus